Bonaparte is a settlement in British Columbia.

References

Settlements in British Columbia